Brendan McKay or Mackay may refer to:

Brendan McKay (mathematician) (born 1951), Australian academic and author
Brendan McKay (baseball) (born 1995), American pitcher and designated hitter
Brendan Mackay (born 1997), Canadian freestyle skier